Amt Scharmützelsee is an Amt ("collective municipality") in the district of Oder-Spree, in Brandenburg, Germany. Its seat is in Bad Saarow.

The Amt Scharmützelsee consists of the following municipalities:
Bad Saarow
Diensdorf-Radlow
Langewahl
Reichenwalde
Wendisch Rietz

Demography

References

Scharmutzelsee
Oder-Spree